Bloodhounds of Broadway is a 1989 American ensemble period comedy film based on four Damon Runyon stories: "The Bloodhounds of Broadway", "A Very Honorable Guy", "The Brain Goes Home" and "Social Error". Directed by Howard Brookner, it stars Matt Dillon, Jennifer Grey, Anita Morris, Julie Hagerty, Rutger Hauer, Madonna, Esai Morales and Randy Quaid. Madonna and Jennifer Grey perform a duet, "I Surrender Dear", during the film. Madonna earned a Golden Raspberry Award nomination for Worst Supporting Actress for her performance in the film, where she lost to Brooke Shields for Speed Zone.

Bloodhounds of Broadway was Brookner's only feature-length film; he died shortly before the film opened. The film was recut by the studio and Walter Winchell-esque narration was added. The film received negative reviews. Six months following its theatrical release, the film was televised as a presentation of PBS's American Playhouse on May 23, 1990.

Plot
Broadway, New Year's Eve, 1928. A muckraking reporter, Waldo Winchester, frames four major stories during the wild New Year's Eve of 1928.

The story starts in a diner. The Brain, a gangster with multiple girlfriends, is accompanied by a gambler named Regret (after the only horse he ever placed a winning bet) and an outsider who (with his bloodhounds) is being treated to a meal. Feet Samuels (so named because of his big feet) is in love with a showgirl named Hortense Hathaway, who is tossed out of the diner because of an unsavory reputation. Feet plans to have one wild night before committing suicide, having sold his body in advance to a medical doctor to avoid welching on a bet.

Harriet MacKyle, a sheltered but friendly socialite, makes arrangements with a smooth-talking fixer for a big party that night at her estate, where many of the players will later attend. She has an interest in the exciting but dangerous criminal element. A girl selling flowers comes in after Feet makes a full payment of a debt to the Brain, so the Brain offers $5 for a 5-cent flower, telling her to keep the change. But before he can leave, a hitman for the Brooklyn Mob stabs him. The wounded Brain tells his men to take him "home", but his many girlfriends refuse to allow him in for various reasons.

Feet gets involved in a high-stakes craps game. With considerable luck, he wins a massive payoff of money and jewelry. Regret suggests they find another game, but Feet reveals his plan to kill himself. Regret tries to talk him out of it, but Feet, sworn to see his last promise fulfilled, is adamant. Regret dials up the reporter, who is now at MacKyle's party, and asks him to talk to Hortense (his niece) and get her to realize Feet is smitten with her.

Hortense must try to persuade Feet that she wants to quit her life as a lounge singer, move to New Jersey and raise a family. Regret, meanwhile, continues to be the world's unluckiest gambler, but showgirl Lovey Lou is in love with him anyway.

Cast
 Matt Dillon as Regret
 Jennifer Grey as Louise "Lovey Lou"
 Julie Hagerty as Harriet MacKyle
 Rutger Hauer as "The Brain" (based on Arnold "The Brain" Rothstein) 
 Madonna as Hortense Hathaway
 Esai Morales as Jack "Handsome Jack"
 Anita Morris as Miss Missouri Martin
 Randy Quaid as "Feet" Samuels
 Josef Sommer as Waldo Winchester (based on Walter Winchell) 
 Steve Buscemi as Willie "Whining Willie"
 Fisher Stevens as Harry "Hotfoot Harry"
 Alan Ruck as John Wangle
 Dinah Manoff as Maud Milligan
 Ethan Phillips as Basil Valentine
 Robert Donley as Doc Bodeeker
 Veryle Rupp as "Whitey"

Production
Principal photography of the film began on December 24, 1987 and completed on February 10, 1988. It was filmed in four cities in New Jersey: Union City, Newark, Jersey City and Montclair.

Reception	

Bloodhounds of Broadway received negative reviews from critics. Produced on a budget of $4 million, the film grossed less than $44,000 in its limited release.

References

External links

1989 films
1989 comedy films
Films set in the 1920s
Films set in 1928
American comedy films
Columbia Pictures films
American Playhouse
Films set around New Year
Films set in New Jersey
Films shot in New Jersey
Films based on short fiction
Films based on multiple works
Films directed by Howard Brookner
1980s English-language films
1980s American films